Gary Nolan (born ) is an English former rugby league footballer for Hull F.C. Nolan was a substitute, and scored a try in Hull FC's 14–4 victory over Widnes in the Premiership Final during the 1990-91 season at Old Trafford, Manchester on 12 May 1991. He had previously scored the winning try in the semi-final against Leeds, leapt into the air to collect a bomb from Greg Mackey and taking the ball out of the hands of Leeds "star" All-Black full-back John Gallagher.

Nolan had been an amateur with Hull Dockers just six weeks previously. He made his mark in the Old Trafford game after entering as a 48th-minute substitute. He claimed the clinching try in the 14–4 win with just 10 minutes remaining when he stretched out an arm through a tangle of bodies. It was only his fourth first-team appearance and he enjoyed only a short career. As of 2007, he is the manager of a food processing plant in Hull.
He now works for ABP in Hull and can be seen stood around most of the time or hanging around the managers office

References

1966 births
Living people
English rugby league players
Hull F.C. players
Rugby articles needing expert attention